John Lynas (18 January 1907 – 1988) was a Scottish professional footballer who played as an outside right for Sunderland, Bo'ness and Third Lanark.

References

1907 births
1988 deaths
People from Blantyre, South Lanarkshire
Footballers from South Lanarkshire
Scottish footballers
Association football outside forwards
Glasgow United F.C. players
Rutherglen Glencairn F.C. players
Bo'ness F.C. players
Raith Rovers F.C. players
Sunderland A.F.C. players
Third Lanark A.C. players
English Football League players
Scottish Football League players
Scottish Junior Football Association players